The Deerfield Township School District is a community public school district that serves students in pre-kindergarten through eighth grade from Deerfield Township, in Cumberland County, New Jersey, United States.

As of the 2021–22 school year, the district, comprised of one school, had an enrollment of 278 students and 29.2 classroom teachers (on an FTE basis), for a student–teacher ratio of 9.5:1.

The district is classified by the New Jersey Department of Education as being in District Factor Group "B", the second-lowest of eight groupings. District Factor Groups organize districts statewide to allow comparison by common socioeconomic characteristics of the local districts. From lowest socioeconomic status to highest, the categories are A, B, CD, DE, FG, GH, I and J.

Public school students in ninth through twelfth grades attend Cumberland Regional High School, which also serves students from Fairfield Township, Greenwich Township, Hopewell Township, Shiloh Borough, Stow Creek Township and Upper Deerfield Township. As of the 2021–22 school year, the high school had an enrollment of 1,081 students and 80.5 classroom teachers (on an FTE basis), for a student–teacher ratio of 13.4:1. Seats on the high school district's board of education are allocated to the constituent municipalities based on population, with Deerfield Township assigned one of the nine seats.

School
Deerfield Township School served a total enrollment of 275 students in grades PreK–8 as of the 2021–22 school year (per the National Center for Education Statistics).
Amy Whilden, Assistant Principal PK-2
Ashleigh Udalovas, Assistant Principal 3-5
Michael Lucchesi, Assistant Principal 6-8

Administration
Core members of the district's administration are:
Dr. Dina Rossi, Superintendent
Joseph Giambri Jr., School Business Administrator/Board Secretary

Board of education
The district's board of education is comprised of seven members who set policy and oversee the fiscal and educational operation of the district through its administration. As a Type II school district, the board's trustees are elected directly by voters to serve three-year terms of office on a staggered basis, with either two or three seats up for election each year held (since 2012) as part of the November general election. The board appoints a superintendent to oversee the district's day-to-day operations and a business administrator to supervise the business functions of the district.

References

External links
Deerfield Township School District

School Data for the Deerfield Township School District, National Center for Education Statistics
Cumberland Regional High School

Deerfield Township, New Jersey
New Jersey District Factor Group B
School districts in Cumberland County, New Jersey
Public K–8 schools in New Jersey